Eigenmannia robsoni is a species of glass knifefish  is found throughout in the rio Parnaíba basin in the northeast of Brazil.

Etymology
The species name of “robsoni” is in honor of Robson Tamar da Costa Ramos, an ichthyologist, who specialized in the studies of the Caatinga ecoregion, including the Parnaíba river basin.

References

Sternopygidae
Fish of Brazil
Taxa named by Guilherme Moreira Dutra
Taxa named by Telton Pedro Anselmo Ramos  
Taxa named by Naércio Aquino de Menezes
Fish described in 2022